The 2013–14 Air Force Falcons men's basketball team represented the United States Air Force Academy. The Falcons, led by second head coach Dave Pilipovich, they played their home games at the Clune Arena on the Air Force Academy's main campus in Colorado Springs, Colorado and were a member of the Mountain West Conference. They finished the season 12–18, 6–12 in Mountain West play to finish in tenth place. They lost in the first round of the Mountain West Conference tournament to Fresno State.

Departures

Recruiting

Roster

Schedule and results 

|-
!colspan=9 style="background:#0038A8; color:#A8ADB4;"| Exhibition

|-
!colspan=9 style="background:#0038A8; color:#A8ADB4;"| Regular season

|-
!colspan=9 style="background:#0038A8; color:#A8ADB4;"| Mountain West tournament

See also 
 2013–14 Air Force Falcons women's basketball team

References 

Air Force
Air Force Falcons men's basketball seasons
Air Force Falcons men's basketball
Air Force Falcons men's basketball